Seraina Prünte (born 16 August 1987) is a Swiss former swimmer, who specialized in freestyle events. She currently holds a Swiss record in the 100 m freestyle (56.06) from the German Olympic Trials in Berlin (2008). A single-time Olympian (2004), Prunte played for the Nikar Swimming Club in Heidelberg, before she trained under head coach Dirk Reinecke as part of the Swiss national team.

Prunte qualified for the women's 4×100 m freestyle relay, as Switzerland's youngest swimmer (aged 16), at the 2004 Summer Olympics in Athens. Teaming with Dominique Diezi, Marjorie Sagne, and Nicole Zahnd in heat two, Prunte swam a third leg and recorded a split of 58.16, but the Swiss women settled only for seventh place and fifteenth overall in a final time of 3:48.61.

References

1987 births
Living people
Olympic swimmers of Switzerland
Swimmers at the 2004 Summer Olympics
Swiss female freestyle swimmers
Sportspeople from Bern
21st-century Swiss women